The Ringling brothers (originally Rüngling) were five American siblings who transformed their small touring company of performers into one of the largest circuses in the United States during the late 19th and early 20th centuries. Four brothers were born in McGregor, Iowa: Alfred T., Charles, John and Henry William, and the family lived in McGregor for twelve years, from 1860 until 1872. The Ringling family then moved to Prairie du Chien, Wisconsin, and finally settled in Baraboo, Wisconsin, in 1875. They were of German and French descent, the children of harness maker Heinrich Friedrich August Ringling (1826–1898) of Hanover, and Marie Salome Juliar (1833–1907) of Ostheim, in Alsace. While there were seven Ringling brothers, Alfred, Charles, John, Al and Otto Ringling were the main brothers in charge of the circus shows. All of the brothers were Freemasons. In 1919, they merged their Ringling Brothers Circus with America's other leading circus troupe, Barnum and Bailey, ultimately creating the Ringling Bros. and Barnum & Bailey Circus, which operated for 98 years, until 2017.

Siblings
Albert Carl "Al" Ringling (1852–1916). Albert divorced his wife in 1914 and died of Bright's disease at the age of 63 in Wisconsin.
Augustus "Gus" Ringling (1854 – ). A founder of the circus, Augustus was largely self-educated. He died at age 55 from complications of various diseases at a sanatorium in New Orleans, where he had arrived two weeks earlier hoping the warmer climate would help his condition.
Otto Ringling (1858–1911). Otto died at the home of his younger brother John, who lived on Fifth Avenue in Manhattan. He was in New York at the time to see a show at Madison Square Garden.
Alfred Theodore "Alf" Ringling (1861–1919). Alfred was a juggler. He had a son, Richard T. Ringling, and a daughter, Marjorie Joan Ringling, who was married to future United States Senator Jacob K. Javits from 1933 to 1936. His granddaughter, Mabel Ringling, married Richard Durant, an elephant trainer. In 1916, Alfred took up residence in Petersburg, New Jersey, now known as Oak Ridge, where he was responsible for the creation of Lake Swannanoa, the body of water that would later become the center point of the Lake Swannanoa lake community. The property was also used as the winter quarters for his son Richard's circus, the R.T. Richards Circus. Alfred died in his 28-room New Jersey manor, three years after its completion, on October 21, 1919.
Charles Edward Ringling (1863–December 3, 1926).
John Nicholas Ringling (1866–1936). John was a singer and a professional clown.
 Henry William George Ringling (1869–1918). Henry was the youngest of the brothers, and died October 10, 1918, of a heart disorder and other internal organ disorders.
Ida Loraina Wilhelmina Ringling (1874–1950). Ida married Harry Whitestone North (1858–1921) in 1902. Their sons were John Ringling North and Henry Ringling North.

References

Further reading
 Apps, Jerry. "Ringlingville USA: The Stupendous Story of Seven Siblings and Their Stunning Circus Success". Wisconsin Magazine of History, vol. 88, no. 4 (Summer 2005): 12-17.
 Schlicher, J. J. "On the Trail of the Ringlings". Wisconsin Magazine of History, vol. 26, no. 1 (September 1942): 8-22.

External links
Ringling Brothers and Barnum & Bailey Circus – Official website
 Ringling Brothers Poster from the Wisconsin Historical Society

Ringling Bros. and Barnum & Bailey Circus people
Circus owners
Sibling performing groups
Circus families
American people of German descent
American people of French descent
American Freemasons